Nadia Ahmed (born 31 August 1982) is a Bangladeshi television actress and dancer. She made her TV debut in 1986 on the BTV children's program Shishumela. as a dancer.

Personal life
Nadia attended Viqarunnisa Noon School and College.
Nadia was married to actor Monir Khan Shimul from 2008 to 2013 November. They stayed separated in between these 5 years for many times. And finally, they got divorced in December 2013. On 14 January 2016 she married actor and model FS Nayeem in a private family ceremony. Their reception was on 16 January 2016 at Gulshan Club.

Works

 Shishumela (1986), television debut
 Baro Rokomer Manush
 Durer Manush (1999)
 Neel Rong'er Golpo (2013)
 Chaar Kanya (2015)
 Obosheshey Kachhe Eshe (2015)
 Nil Megh Kuasha Ar Bhalobasa (2015)
 Ekti Babui Pakhir Basha (2016)
 Pagla Hawar Din (2016) as Shuvo
 Ora Bokhate (2016)
 Megher Pore Megh Jomeche (2016-2017)
 Ayna Ghor (2016-2017)
 Alpo Salpo Galpo (2017) as Ina
 Brishtider Bari (2017)
 Babui Pakhir Basa (2017)
 Childhood Love (2017)
 Robinhood Ase Nai Tai (2017)
 200 Kathbeli (2017)
 Blindness (2017)
 Sartho-e Sokol Sukher Mul (2017)
 Tor Kopale Dukhkho Achhe (2017)
 Obosheshe Oboshan (2017)
 Sikriti (2017)
 Tomay Hrid Majhare Rakhbo (2017)

References

Further reading
 

Living people
Bangladeshi choreographers
Bangladeshi television actresses
Bangladeshi female dancers
20th-century Bangladeshi actresses
20th-century dancers
21st-century Bangladeshi actresses
21st-century dancers
1982 births